Freddy Aleksander Damnjanovic Nilsson (born 5 September 2002) is a Swedish footballer who plays as a midfielder for Sandefjord, on loan from Malmö FF.

Club career
Born in Malmö, Damnjanovic Nilsson started his career with Malmö FF. In the fall of 2021, he was loaned out to Jammerbugt in Denmark. In March 2022, he moved to Sandefjord on loan until August 2022. When the loan ends, he will join the club permanently until the end of the 2024 season. On 3 April 2022, he made his Eliteserien debut in a 3–1 win against Haugesund.

International career
Damnjanovic Nilsson has represented Sweden from under-15 to under-18 level.

References

External links

2002 births
Living people
Footballers from Malmö
Association football midfielders
Swedish footballers
Sweden youth international footballers
Malmö FF players
Jammerbugt FC players
Sandefjord Fotball players
Danish 1st Division players
Eliteserien players
Swedish expatriate footballers
Expatriate men's footballers in Denmark
Swedish expatriate sportspeople in Denmark
Expatriate footballers in Norway
Swedish expatriate sportspeople in Norway